Maciej Freimut (born February 24, 1967) is a Polish sprint canoeist who competed from the late 1980s to the late 1990s. Competing in three Summer Olympics, he won a silver in the K-2 500 m event at Barcelona in 1992.

Freimut also won seven medals at the ICF Canoe Sprint World Championships with a gold (K-2 200 m: 1994), four silvers (K-1 1000 m: 1990, K-2 500 m: 1993, K-4 1000 m: 1989, K-4 10000 m: 1993), and two bronzes: K-2 500 m: 1989, 1995).

European Championships Medal History

References

1967 births
Canoeists at the 1988 Summer Olympics
Canoeists at the 1992 Summer Olympics
Canoeists at the 1996 Summer Olympics
Living people
Olympic canoeists of Poland
Olympic silver medalists for Poland
Polish male canoeists
Olympic medalists in canoeing
People from Wąbrzeźno
ICF Canoe Sprint World Championships medalists in kayak
Sportspeople from Kuyavian-Pomeranian Voivodeship
Medalists at the 1992 Summer Olympics